Lugosi v. Universal Pictures, 603 P.2d 425 (Cal. 1979), was a decision of the Supreme Court of California with regard to the personality rights of celebrities, particularly addressing whether these rights descended to the celebrities' heirs. The suit was brought by the heirs of Béla Lugosi, his son Bela Jr. and his fifth wife Hope Lugosi, who jointly sued Universal Pictures in 1966 for using his personality rights without the heirs' permission on toys, posters, model kits and the like. The trial court initially ruled in favor of the Lugosi heirs, but Universal Studios won the case in an appeal. The court determined that a dead person had no right to their likeness, and any rights that existed did not pass to their heirs.

History
In September 1930, Béla Lugosi and Universal Pictures had entered into an agreement for the production of the film Dracula in which Lugosi played the title role under a signed contract. Hope Linninger Lugosi, his widow, and Bela George Lugosi, his son, filed a complaint against Universal on February 3, 1966, alleging that they were the heirs of Béla Lugosi and that Universal had, commencing in 1960, appropriated and continued to appropriate property which they had inherited from Lugosi and which was not part of the agreement with Universal. The Lugosis asserted that from 1960 until the present time, Universal entered into many licensing agreements which authorized the licensees to use the Count Dracula character.

[Lugosi heirs] seek to recover the profits made by [Universal Studios] in its licensing of the use of the Count Dracula character to commercial firms and to enjoin [Universal Studios] from making any additional grants, without [their] consent .... The action, therefore, raises the question of whether Béla Lugosi had granted to [Universal] in his contracts with [Universal] merchandising rights in his movie portrayal of Count Dracula, the nature of such rights, and whether any such rights, if retained by Béla Lugosi, descended to the [Lugosi heirs] ....

Ruling
After eleven years of litigation, the trial judge ruled in favor of the Lugosi heirs, awarded them $70,000, and barred Universal Studios from merchandising Lugosi's likeness. The decision was appealed and the California Supreme Court ruled that "the right to exploit one's name and likeness is personal to the artist and must be exercised, if at all, by him during his lifetime." The result was a loss for the concept of inheriting personality rights in California.

Aftermath
The California Celebrities Rights Act of 1986 created an inheritable right to a person's name or likeness for 70 years after death. Legislation passed in 2007 extended that right retroactively to all persons who have died since January 1, 1938.

See also
Shaw Family Archives Ltd. v. CMG Worldwide, Inc. (2007), a court case involving Marilyn Monroe's posthumous personality rights

References

External links
California Civil Code - Section 3344 - 3344.1 (Astaire Celebrity Image Protection Act)

United States intellectual property case law
California state case law
Personality rights
1979 in United States case law
Universal Pictures litigation
1979 in California
Supreme Court of California case law